Gluboky is an urban locality in Kamensky District of Rostov Oblast, Russia. Population:

References

Urban-type settlements in Rostov Oblast
Don Host Oblast